Under the Sign of the Black Mark is the third studio album by Swedish extreme metal band Bathory. It was recorded in September 1986 and released on 11 May 1987 through New Renaissance Records and Under One Flag. It was a key album in the development of the black metal genre, and greatly influenced the Norwegian black metal scene that emerged in the early 1990s.

Background and recording 
The photograph on the cover was by Gunnar Silins, from a photograph in the Royal Swedish Opera in Stockholm. The model used was Leif Ehrnborg, a then-top class Swedish bodybuilder.

The song "Woman of Dark Desires" is a tribute to the band's namesake, Elizabeth Báthory. "Enter the Eternal Fire" was the band's first epic, reaching nearly seven minutes in length, with lyrics referring to a deal with the Devil. The song "Equimanthorn" makes references to Hell as well as to Norse mythology, including Odin's "eight-legged black stallion" Sleipnir.

Critical reception and legacy

Eduardo Rivadavia of AllMusic wrote that the album "remains a career highlight for Bathory, and a crucial LP for all lovers of extreme metal." Fenriz of Darkthrone called it "the quintessential black metal album". He also cited it as a musical inspiration for the 1995 Darkthrone album Panzerfaust, besides Celtic Frost's Morbid Tales and Vader's Necrolust demo.

On the album's impact, Daniel Ekeroth, author of the book Swedish Death Metal, commented in an interview with Decibel magazine in 2012: "Even by Bathory's standards, this was a masterpiece, on par with both Bonded by Blood and Reign in Blood. The songs were perfected, and the sound more atmospheric and uncanny than before. Bathory were now the most extreme and one of the very best metal bands out there."

The song "Call from the Grave" was featured in 2009 game Grand Theft Auto IV: The Lost and Damned

In 2017, Rolling Stone ranked Under the Sign of the Black Mark as 81st on their list of 'The 100 Greatest Metal Albums of All Time.'

Phil Anselmo from Pantera covers the song Massacre with his project band Scour.

Track listing 

Outro track introduced on 2003 remastered edition.

Personnel
Bathory
 Quorthon – guitar, vocals, bass guitar, synthesizer, producer, mixing, cover design 
 Paul "Pålle" Lundburg - drums
 Christer Sandström – additional bass guitar

Production
 The Boss (Börje Forsberg) – producer, engineer, mixing

References

External links 
 

Bathory (band) albums
Black metal albums by Swedish artists
1987 albums